This is a list of named geological features on Tethys. Tethyan geological features are named after people and places in Homer's The Iliad and The Odyssey.

Chasmata

There are two named chasmata on Tethys.

Montes

The central complex of the Odysseus basin is called Scheria Montes.

Craters

References

External links

Tethys